Charles McDevitt may refer to:

Charles F. McDevitt (1932–2021), Justice of the Idaho Supreme Court
Chas McDevitt (born 1934), Scottish musician